Mer (also called Muri, Miere) is a Papuan language spoken in Papua province of Indonesia.

Groups
There are two groups of Miere speakers:

Gunung ("Mountain") or Kakak ("elder") group, in Yabore village, Naikere District
Pantai ("Beach") or Adik ("younger") group, in Senderewoi village, Rasiey District

References

Languages of western New Guinea
Mairasi languages